This is a list of the squads participated for the  2016 Super T20 Provincial Tournament.

Colombo Commandos 

||  || Milinda Siriwardene (c) || 30 || All-rounder || LHB || LO
|-
||  || Dhananjaya de Silva || 24 || Batsman || RHB || LOS
|-
||  || Niroshan Dickwella || 22 || Wicket-keeper Batsman || LHB || 
|-
||  || Shaminda Eranga || 29 || Bolwer || RHB || RMF
|-
||  || Vishwa Fernando || 24 || All-rounder || RHB || LMF
|-
||  || Upul Indrasiri || 33 || Bowler || LHB || LO
|-
||  || Shehan Jayasuriya || 24 || All-rounder || LHB || ROS
|-
||  || Shehen Jayawardene || 32 || All-rounder || RHB || RFM
|-
||  || Lahiru Madushanka || 23 || All-rounder || RHB || RFM
|-
||  || Ramesh Mendis || 20 || All-rounder || RHB || ROS
|-
||  || Nadeera Nawela || 31 || Batsman || RHB || RFM
|-
||  || Rashmika Opatha || 18 || All-rounder || RHB || ROS
|-
||  || Kasun Rajitha || 22 || All-rounder || RHB || RMF
|-
||  || Ramith Rambukwella || 24 || Opening batsman || LHB || ROS
|-
||  || Lasanda Rukmal || 25 || All-rounder || RHB || RMF
|-
||  || Sadeera Samarawickrama || 20 || Wicket-keeper || RHB || 
|-
||  || Dasun Shanaka || 24 || All-rounder || RHB || RMF
|-
|}
|}

Galle Guardians 

||  || Dinesh Chandimal (Captain) || 26 || Wicket-keeper batsman || RHB || 
|-
||  || Amila Aponso || 22 || Batsman || RHB || LO
|-
||  || Tilaksha Sumanasiri || 21 || Batsman || RHB || ROS
|-
||  || Dushmantha Chameera || 24 || Bolwer || RHB || RF
|-
||  || Dilhara Lokuhettige || 35 || All-rounder || RHB || RMF
|-
||  || Hashan Dumindu || 20 || Bowler || RHB || ROS
|-
||  || Udara Jayasundera || 25 || All-rounder || LHB || LB
|-
||  || Prabath Jayasuriya || 24 || All-rounder || RHB || LO
|-
||  || Suraj Randiv || 30 || All-rounder || RHB || ROS
|-
||  || Shalika Karunanayake || 28 || All-rounder || RHB || RMF
|-
||  || Ajantha Mendis || 30 || Bowler || RHB || ROS
|-
||  || Lahiru Milantha || 21 || Wicket-keeper || LHB || 
|-
||  || Dilshan Munaweera || 26 || Opening batsman || RHB || ROS
|-
||  || Primosh Perera || 26 || Bastman || LHB || LB
|-
||  || Isuru Udana || 27 || Bowler || RHB || RMF
|-
||  || Jeffrey Vandersay || 25 || Bowler || RHB || LB
|-
||  || Kithuruwan Vithanage || 24 || All-rounder || LHB || LB
|-
|}
|}

Hambantota Troopers 

||  || Tillakaratne Dilshan (Captain) || 39 || All-rounder || RHB || ROS
|-
||  || Binura Fernando || 20 || Bowler || RHB || RMF
|-
||  || Lahiru Gamage || 27 || Bowler || RHB || RMF
|-
||  || Angelo Jayasinghe || 22 || Batsman || RHB || RLB
|-
||  || Dimuth Karunaratne || 27 || Opening bastman || LHB || RMF
|-
||  || Jehan Mubarak || 35 || All-rounder || LHB || ROS
|-
||  || Sachith Pathirana || 26 || All-rounder || LHB || LO
|-
||  || Dilruwan Perera || 33 || All-rounder || RHB || ROS
|-
||  || Seekkuge Prasanna || 30 || All-rounder || RHB || RLB
|-
||  || Ashan Priyanjan || 26 || All-rounder || RHB || ROS
|-
||  || Malinda Pushpakumara || 28 || Batsman || RHB || LO
|-
||  || Denuwan Rajakaruna || 25 ||  || RHB || 
|-
||  || Lakshina Rodrigo || 18 || Wicket-keeper || RHB || 
|-
||  || Lakshan Sandakan || 24 || Bowler || RHB || LWS
|-
||  || Alankara Asanka Silva || 30 || All-rounder || RHB || ROS
|-
||  || Andy Solomons || 28 ||  || RHB || RFM
|-
||  || Thilan Thushara || 34 || Bowler || LHB || LFM
|-
||  || Sandun Weerakkody || 22 || Wicket-keeper Batsman || LHB
|-
|}
|}

Kandy Crusaders 

||  || Lahiru Thirimanne (c) || 26 || Batsman || LHB || LMF
|-
||  || Lasith Ambuldeniya ||   || Bowler || LHB || LO
|-
||  || Minod Bhanuka || 20 || Opening Batsman || LHB || 
|-
||  || Akila Dananjaya || 22 || Bowler || LHB || ROB
|-
||  || Dilhara Fernando || 36 || Bowler || RHB || RF
|-
||  || Anuk Fernando || 20 || All-rounder || LHB || RMF
|-
||  || Danushka Gunathilaka || 24 || All-rounder || LHB || RMF
|-
||  || Saliya Saman || 30 || All-rounder || RHB || RMF
|-
||  || Suranga Lakmal || 28 || Bowler || RHB || RMF
|-
||  || Jeevan Mendis || 33 || All-rounder || LHB || LB
|-
||  || Angelo Perera || 25 || All-rounder || RHB || LO
|-
||  || Thisara Perera || 26 || All-rounder || LHB || RMF
|-
||  || Chathura Randunu || 31 || All-rounder || LHB || LO
|-
||  || Manoj Sarathchandra || 22 || Wicket-keeper || RHB || 
|-
||  || Sachithra Senanayake || 30 || All-rounder || RHB || ROB
|}
|}

Kurunegala Warriors 

||  || Mahela Udawatte (c) || 29 || Batsman || LHB || ROB
|-
||  || Lasith Abeyratne || 22 || Wicket-keeper || LHB || 
|-
||  || Rumesh Buddika || 25 || Batsman || LHB || ROB
|-
||  || Chaturanga de Silva || 26 || Batsman || LHB || LO
|-
||  || Nuwan Pradeep || 29 || Bowler || RHB || RMF
|-
||  || Oshada Fernando || 23 || All-rounder || RHB || LB
|-
||  || Shehan Fernando || 22 || All-rounder || RHB || ROB
|-
||  || Asela Gunaratne || 30 || All-rounder || RHB || RMF
|-
||  || Imran Khan || 23 || Bowler || LHB || RMF
|-
||  || Ishan Jayaratne || 26 || All-rounder || RHB || RMF
|-
||  || Chamara Kapugedera || 28 || All-rounder || RHB || RMF
|-
||  || Tharindu Kaushal || 22 || Bowler || RHB || ROB
|-
||  || Maduka Liyanapathiranage || 24 || All-rounder || RHB || ROB
|-
||  || Kasun Madushanka || 24 || Bowler || RHB || RMF
|-
||  || Kusal Mendis || 20 || Batsman || RHB || 
|-
||  || Upul Tharanga || 30 || Batsman || LHB || 
|}
|}

References

External links
 2016 Super T20 Provincial teams on ESPN CricInfo

Inter-Provincial Twenty20
Inter-Provincial Twenty20
2016 in Sri Lankan cricket